Kyenjojo is a town in the Western Region of Uganda. It is the main municipal, administrative, and commercial center of Kyenjojo District and the site of the district headquarters.

Location
Kyenjojo is at the intersection of two major highways. The Kyenjojo–Kabwoya Road makes a T-junction with the Mubende–Fort Portal Road in the middle of town. The coordinates of the town are 0°36'36.0"N, 30°38'39.0"E (Latitude:0.6100; Longitude:30.6442).

Population
In 2002, the national census estimated the population of the town at 15,040. In 2010, the Uganda Bureau of Statistics (UBOS) estimated the population at 20,100. In 2011, UBOS estimated the population at 20,900. On 27 August 2014, the national population census put the population at 23,467.

In 2015, the town's population was projected at 23,700. In 2020, the mid-year population of Kyenjojo Town Council was projected at 28,600. It was calculated that the population of he town increased at an average annual rate of 3.8 percent, between 2015 and 2020.

Points of interest
The following additional points of interest are within the town limits or close to the edges of town: the offices of Kyenjojo Town Council, the offices of Kyenjojo District Local Government, Kyenjojo central market, Kyenjojo General Hospital, a public hospital administered by the Uganda Ministry of Health and a mobile Branch of PostBank Uganda. Opportunity Bank Uganda and Centenary Bank also maintain branches in the town.

See also
Toro Kingdom
List of cities and towns in Uganda

References

External links
 Kyenjojo: Government Injects Shs400m In Tea Growing

Populated places in Western Region, Uganda
Cities in the Great Rift Valley
Kyenjojo District
Toro sub-region